Desh may refer to:

Arts
 Desh (raga), an Indian classical music scale (raga in both Hindustani music and Carnatic music)

Media
 Desh (magazine), a Bengali magazine
 Desh TV, a Bangladeshi TV channel
 Desh (film), a 2002 Bengali film directed by Raja Sen
 Desh Bouksani, the name of a rival assassin in the 2007 film The Bourne Ultimatum, directed by Paul Greengrass

Places
 -desh, an Indo-Aryan word for "country", which appears in the names of many places
 Desh, Maharashtra, a place in India
 Bangladesh, a country in South Asia, comprising East Bengal
 Brahmadesh, an alternative name for Burma/Myanmar meaning "Land of Brahma"
 Garhdesh, a historical name for Garhwal division in Uttarakhand
 Gurjardesh, a historical region in India comprising eastern Rajasthan and northern Gujarat
 Khandesh, historic region in North India
 Khandesh District, historic administrative district
 Sindhudesh, a concept floated by some Sindhi nationalist parties in Pakistan for the creation of an independent Sindhi state

See also
 Daesh (disambiguation)
 Pradesh
 -stan
 -land
 -pur
 Ganj (disambiguation)
 -abad